Symbolic Link (SYLK) is a Microsoft file format typically used to exchange data between applications, specifically spreadsheets. SYLK files conventionally have a .slk suffix. Composed of only displayable ANSI characters, it can be easily created and processed by other applications, such as databases.

Microsoft does not publish a SYLK specification.  Variants of the format are supported by Multiplan, Microsoft Excel, Microsoft Works, OpenOffice.org, LibreOffice and Gnumeric. The format was introduced in the 1980s and has not evolved since 1986.

A commonly encountered (and spurious) 'occurrence' of the SYLK file happens when a comma-separated value (CSV) format is saved with an unquoted first field name of 'ID', that is the first two characters match the first two characters of the SYLK file format.  Microsoft Excel (at least to Office 2016) will then emit misleading error messages relating to the format of the file, such as "The file you are trying to open, 'x.csv', is in a different format than specified by the file extension...".

SYLK is known to cause security issues, as it allows an attacker to run arbitrary code, offers the opportunity to disguise the attack vector under the benign-looking appearance of a CSV file, and is still enabled by default on recent (2016) versions of Microsoft Excel.

Limitations
SYLK does not have support for Unicode.  Even if a SYLK file is created by an application that supports Unicode (for example Microsoft Excel), the SYLK file will be encoded in the current system's ANSI code page, not in Unicode.  If the application contained characters that were displayable in Unicode but have no code point in the current system's code page, they will be converted to question marks ('?') in the SYLK file.

The semicolon is treated as a field separator in SYLK, so cannot be used unescaped in data values.  If a character string in the SYLK file is to contain a semicolon then it should be prefixed with another semicolon so the string would appear as e.g., "WIDGET;;AXC1254". MS Excel will strip the first semicolon on import and the data element will appear as "WIDGET;AXC1254".

Each line of a SYLK input file must be no longer than 260 characters.  Otherwise, Microsoft Excel will issue an error message and skip loading the overlong line.

Sample SYLK code

As an example, the following SYLK code in a text file with the .slk extension:

 ID;P
 C;Y1;X1;K"Row 1"
 C;Y2;X1;K"Row 2"
 C;Y3;X1;K"Total"
 C;Y1;X2;K11
 C;Y2;X2;K22
 C;Y3;X2;K33
 E

would be displayed like this when read by an appropriate spreadsheet:

for numeric formatting 
The formatting of 2 decimal digits is applied to Column 2 using F;P2;C2
where P0 is for General, P1 is for no decimal, P2 is for 2 digits, P3 has leading $ sign with 2 decimal points as defined below.

 ID;P
 P;PGeneral
 P;P_(* #,##0_);;_(* \-#,##0_);;_(* "-"_);;_(@_)
 P;P_(* #,##0.00_);;_(* \(#,##0.00\);;_(* "-"??_);;_(@_)
 P;P_("$"* #,##0.00_);;_("$"* \(#,##0.00\);;_("$"* "-"??_);;_(@_)
 C;Y1;X1;K"Row 1"
 C;Y2;X1;K"Row 2"
 C;Y3;X1;K"Total"
 C;Y1;X2;K11
 C;Y2;X2;K22
 C;Y3;X2;K0;ER1C2+R2C2
 F;P2;C2
 E

would be displayed like this when read by an appropriate spreadsheet:

for column width 
 defines the widths of a group of columns:

[S]  one space
< n1 >  the first column
< n2 >  the last column
< n3 >  the width of columns in number of characters

For example: Adding these SYLK codes will adjust the column width of column 1 and 2 to 20 and 30 respectively.

F;W1 1 20
F;W2 2 30

cell formatting properties 
  F; < cl > < n > < c2 >
 < cl >  one of the following 1-character formatting codes:
 D  default
 C  continuous cross-cell display
 E  scientific exponentiation
 F  fixed decimal point
 G  general format
 $  leading $ and 2 decimal points
 *  bar graph, one asterisk per unit (5 would be *****)
< n >  the number of digits.
< c2 >  one of the following 1-character alignment codes:
 D  default
 C  center
 G  general(textleft, numbersright) 
 L  left justify
 R  right justify

For example: The following SYLK code demonstrates the cell formatting properties:

 ID;P
 P;PGeneral
 C;Y1;X1;K"Row 1 Left Justify"
 F;P0;FG0L
 C;Y2;X1;K"Row 2 Right Justify"
 F;P0;FG0R
 C;Y3;X1;K"Total at Center"
 F;P0;FG0C
 C;Y1;X2;K11
 C;Y2;X2;K22
 C;Y3;X2;K0;ER1C2+R2C2
 F;Y1;X2;FF2L
 F;Y2;X2;FF2R
 F;Y3;X2;F$2C
 F;W1 2 25
 E

SYLK syntax
SYLK_file ::=
	Record +

Record ::=
	RecordType Field* newline
 ID record
 Use:
 A header to identify spreadsheet type and creator.
 Must be first record in the file.
 Record type:
 ID
 Mandatory fields:
 P program
 file creator
 possible creators include:
 MP (Multiplan)
 XL (Excel)
 Possible fields:
 N
 If present, file uses ;N style cell protection
 If absent, file uses ;P style cell protection
 E
 If present, NE records are redundant
 If absent, NE records are not redundant
 B record
 Use:
 Tells number of rows and columns in the spreadsheet.
 Recommended that it come before C and F records
 Record type:
 B
 Mandatory fields:
 X columns
 tells maximum number of columns
 Y rows
 tells maximum number of rows
 C record
 Use:
 Cell contents
 Record type:
 C
 Mandatory fields:
 X column
 column position (one based)
 Possible fields:
 Y row
 row position (one based). If omitted, most recently encountered value is used.
 E expression
 expression for the cell
 K value
 value of the cell
 C column
 column reference
 R row
 row reference
 G
 defines shared value
 D
 defines shared expression
 S
 references shared value or shared expression
 N
 If present, the cell is not protected.
 If absent and ;N is present in the ID record, cell is protected.
 P
 If present, cell is protected.
 If absent and ;N is absent in the ID record, cell is not protected.
 H
 If present, cell is hidden.
 If absent, cell is not hidden.
 M expression
 matrix expression from (X,Y) to (C,R)
 I
 inside a matrix
 Compatible fields:
 If ;G is present, ;E must be absent.
 If ;G is present, ;K must be present.
 If ;D is present, ;E must be present.
 If ;S is present, ;E, ;K, ;G, ;D, and ;M must be absent.
 If ;S is present, ;R and ;C must be present. (They define the row and column that the shared value/expression is copied from.)
 If ;N is present in the ID record, ;P must be absent.
 If ;N is absent from the ID record, ;N must be absent.
 If ;M is present, ;E must be absent.
 If ;I is present, ;K and ;E must be absent
 P record
 Use:
 Cell format
 If F records are present, precedes them.
 Mandatory fields:
 P formatting
 Excel style cell format specification
 F record
 Use:
 Format
 If P record(s) are present, follows them.
 Possible fields:
 X column
 column (one based)
 Y row
 row (one based)
 C column
 column (one based)
 R row
 row (one based)
 F format
 Cell/row/column format
 The format of format is
 ch1 digits ch2
 ch1 is
Ddefault
Ccurrency
Eexponent
Ffixed
Ggeneral
$dollar
*graph
%percent
 digits is number of digits after decimal point
 ch2 is alignment
Ddefault
Ccenter
Gstandard
Lleft
Rright
-ignored
Xfill
 D format
 Default format.
 The format of format is
 ch1 digits ch2
 ch1 is
Ccurrency
Eexponent
Ffixed
Ggeneral
$dollar
*graph
%percent
 digits is number of digits after decimal point
 ch2 is alignment
Ccenter
Gstandard
Lleft
Rright
-ignored
Xfill
 E
 show formulas
 K
 show commas
 W col1 col2 width
 set column widths
 N fontid size
 font to use
 P index
 Excel cell format, number of the P record (e.g. P0 means the first P record, which is usually declared as P;PGeneral
 S style
 style
 The following characters can be part of style
Iitalic
Dbold
Tgridline top
Lgridline left
Bgridline bottom
Rgridline right
Sshaded background
 H
 If present, don't show row/column headers
 If absent in the entire file, show row/column headers
 G
 If present, don't show default gridlines
 If absent in the entire file, show default gridlines
 Compatible fields:
 At least one of ;X, ;Y, ;C, ;R, ;D, ;E, ;K, ;W, ;P, ;H, or ;G must be present.
 If ;X or ;Y is present, both ;X and ;Y must be present. (This sets cell format.)
 If ;X is present, ;R, ;C, ;E, ;K, ;W, ;N, ;H, ;G must be absent.
 If ;R is present, ;X, ;Y, ;C, ;E, ;K, ;W, ;N, ;H, ;G must be absent. (This sets default row format.)
 If ;C is present, ;X, ;Y, ;R, ;E, ;K, ;W, ;N, ;H, ;G must be absent. (This sets default column format.)
 If ;D is present, ;X, ;Y, ;R, ;C must be absent. (This sets default spreadsheet format.)
 If ;X, ;Y, ;R, ;C are present, ;P and/or ;F and/or ;S must be present.
 O record
 Use:
 Options
 Possible fields:
 A iter delta
 If present, allow value iteration
 If absent, circular references are not allowed.
 iter (maximum number of iterations)
 delta (step test. If smaller, then finished.)
 C
 completion test at nearest preceding C record
 P
 sheet is protected
 L
 use A1 mode references
 Even if ;L is given R1C1 references are used in SYLK file expressions.
 M
 If present, use manual recalculation.
 If absent, use automatic recalculation.
 E
 Macro sheet.
 This should appear before the first appearance of a ;G or ;F field in a NN record.
 This should appear before the first C record which uses a macro-only function.
 V value
 value indicates the base date used for calculating serial date values
0:1 January 1900
4:1 January 1904
 NU record
 Use:
 file name substitution
 If NE record(s) are present, must precede them.
 Mandatory fields:
 L filename
 old filename
 F filename
 new filename
 NE record
 Use:
 external link
 Mandatory fields:
 E expression
 Target area on spreadsheet
 F filename
 Source file
 S expression
 Source area on external sheet
 NN record
 Use:
 Defines names
 More efficient if NN appears before name use.
 Mandatory fields:
 N name
 name
 E expression
 expression describing value of name
 Possible fields:
 G ch1 ch2
 runable name (macro) with command key alias
 K ch1 ch2
 ordinary name with unused command aliases
 F
 usable as a function
 Compatible fields:
 If ;G is present, ;K must be absent.
 W record
 Use:
 Window definitions
 NL record
 Use:
 Chart external link
 E record
 Use:
 End of file.
 Must be last record.

Date and time are stored as a floating point value. The whole number part is a number of days from the Jan 1 1900 (if the O record contains the ;V0 directive, specifying 1900 as the starting point for calculations), the fraction is the number of seconds divided by 86400 (60*60*24, number of seconds in a day). Conversion to unix time can be done by subtracting the difference between Jan 1 1970 and Jan 1 1900 (25,569 days) and then multiplying by 86400; converting from unix time to SYLK datetime is done by dividing the value by 86400 and then adding 25569. The cell style has to be set to some date formatting value, e.g.  to be displayed properly.

.slk file exports opened with Excel have a limit of 255 characters in a cell. This limit is not present in LibreOffice.

External links
 Detailed examples can also be found at here

Syntax for SYLK can be found at:

 Microsoft SYLK summary (see also the Abusing the SYLK file format article for some useful information)
 GFF Format Summary: Microsoft SYLK
and at:
 comp.apps.spreadsheets FAQ
 Excel Tips Converting Unix Date Time Stamps

Limits related to reading and saving with Excel:

 Microsoft.com Excel features

References

Spreadsheet file formats
Microsoft Office